Go Jae-hyeon (born 5 March 1999) is a South Korean football midfielder who plays for Daegu FC and the South Korea national under-23 football team.

Career statistics

Honours

Domestic
Daegu FC
 Korean FA Cup: 2018

International
South Korea U20
FIFA U-20 World Cup runner-up: 2019

References

1999 births
Living people
Association football midfielders
South Korean footballers
Daegu FC players
Seoul E-Land FC players
K League 1 players
K League 2 players